James "Quick" Parker (January 1, 1958 – March 27, 2018) was a Canadian football player who was a leading defensive player in the Canadian Football League. He was born in Philadelphia, Pennsylvania.

After attending Wake Forest University from 1976 to 1979, where he was a conference all star and second in all-time career sacks with 15, Parker joined the Edmonton Eskimos in 1980, right in the middle of the greatest dynasty in CFL history. He played with them for 4 years, until 1983, when he moved to the BC Lions for six seasons (from 1984 to 1989) and finished his 12-year career with the Toronto Argonauts (1990 to 1991).

Though small, Parker was famed for his quick burst off the line of scrimmage. He won the CFL's Most Outstanding Defensive Player Award three times (1982, 1984, 1986) and was an all star six times. He played in five Grey Cup games, winning four championships. During 1984 season, his first with the BC Lions, he had 26.5 sacks in a single season which is still a CFL record. Parker has the fourth-highest number of regular season quarterback sacks in CFL history, with 139.5.

Parker was inducted into the Wake Forest University's Sports Hall of Fame in 1997 and the Canadian Football Hall of Fame in 2001. In November 2006, he was voted one of the CFL's Top 50 players (#21) of the league's modern era by Canadian sports network The Sports Network/TSN.

James most recently worked at La-Z-Boy Furniture Galleries in Langley BC where he has been recognized as a member of the Presidents Club for outstanding sales performance.  The BC Lions announced that he died on March 27, 2018.

Awards and honours
CFL All Star Team - 1981, 1982, 1984, 1985, 1986
Western All Star (Outside Linebacker, Defensive End) - 1981, 1982, 1983, 1984, 1985, 1986
Schenley Most Outstanding Defensive Player - 1982, 1984, 1986
Grey Cup Defensive Player of the Game - 1985
Norm Fieldgate Trophy (Most Outstanding Defensive Player in the Western Division) - 1982, 1984, 1986
Grey Cups played in - 1980, 1981, 1982, 1985, 1988
Grey Cup championships - 1980, 1981, 1982, 1985

References

1958 births
2018 deaths
Players of Canadian football from Philadelphia
American players of Canadian football
Canadian football defensive linemen
Canadian football linebackers
Wake Forest Demon Deacons football players
Edmonton Elks players
BC Lions players
Toronto Argonauts players
Canadian Football League Most Outstanding Defensive Player Award winners
Canadian Football Hall of Fame inductees